The walls of Lisbon are a series of three nested defensive stone-wall complexes built at different times to defend Lisbon.  They consist of the São Jorge Castle proper and its walls (cidadela or citadel), the cerca moura (or cerca velha) and its lateral extension the muralha de D. Diniz, and the cerca fernandina.  While the castle walls are essentially intact, the remaining walls are only visible in fragments embedded in buildings and open spaces in contemporary Lisbon.

If it was remade into a 1 m high wall, the masonry in the cerca fernandina would stretch from Lisbon to Porto, approximately.

History

Cidadela

The first fortifications comprising the castle date from the 1st century BC.  Walls that included the castle site were possibly built around the Roman municipality of Lisbon when it was established in 48 BC.  Following the Roman era, the Suebi and the Visigoths also used the cidadela.

Cerca moura

In Lisbon's Moorish era the castle and its walled settlement existed by the 10th century and were reinforced in the 11th century during the Taifa Iberian kingdoms when it was menaced by both Christian and Islamic forces.  Historic descriptions of Lisbon by Arabic geographers name some of the gates in its walls: Bab al-Hawha (Porta da Alfôfa), Bab al-Bahr (Porta do Mar), Bab al-Hamma — giving Alfama its name (Porta de Alfama), Bab al-Maqbara (Porta do Sol) and Bab al-Madiq (Porta Conde de Linhares).  In 1147, D. Afonso Henriques, in company of the second crusade, ejected the Moors from Lisbon.  The city repulsed further attacks by Moorish forces in subsequent decades.

Muralha de D. Dinis

In 1294, king of Portugal D. Dinis built a westward extension along the Tagus estuary radiating from the southwesternmost corner of the cerca moura.  Construction took less than a year. Probably built to protect expanding Lisbon's shoreline commerce from piracy, it did not enclose any sector of Lisbon but barricaded the low-lying parts of what is now the Baixa.  The 1755 earthquake destroyed aboveground sections of the wall, but excavations under the Bank of Portugal revealed its extensive foundations, now open to public view.

Cerca fernandina

Two centuries after D. Afonso Henriques' reign, the Portuguese king D. Fernando I became involved in a succession dispute with Castile.  In the mid-1300s, Lisbon endured attacks by Castilian armies that degraded its defenses.  In 1373 D. Fernando I ordered the walls to be strengthened and enlarged.  This work included similar construction around the kingdom's other nearby coastal towns: Almada, Sesimbra, Palmela, Setúbal, Coina, Benavente — essentially all of the Tagus region's population.  The inland communities of Sintra, Cascais, Torres Vedras, Mafra, Alanquer, Arruda, Atouguia, Lourinhá, Chileiros, Póvos, Villa-Franca and Aldea Gallega were also concurrently fortified.  In Lisbon, the wall was completed in 1375, in a rather astonishing two-year period.

Unbuilt extensions
The Portuguese king D. João III considered building a moat-enclosed wall around Lisbon in the 1500s connecting the Alcântara drainage to the west (spanned by the aqueduct) with the Rio de Sacavém (now Rio Trancão) to the east.  The project was never started.

Between 1650-1652 D. João IV wanted to expand Lisbon's fortifications in a more limited way.  The plan was to extend the cerca fernandina from S. Roque northwest towards Rato, veering northeast around Saldanha and Alameda, thence back to N. S. do Monte in Graça and finally downward to the banks of the Tagus at Santa Apolonia.  It was never realized.

Characteristics

Cerca moura
Generally 2—2.5 m thick, the wall extends from the southern flank of the cidadela for a distance of 1250 m.  Including the cidadela, it encloses .

Muralha de D. Diniz
This lateral extension of the cerca moura runs for about 700 m parallel to the historic estuarine banks.  The wall's base was up to 2.7 m wide and around 1.5 m wide above ground.  Construction materials were locally sourced limestone for the foundation and cemented aggregate above ground, similar to the cerca fernandina.

Cerca fernandina
The cerca fernandina consists of two parts extending to the east and west of the cerca moura.  The eastern segment is 1920 m long and the western segment is 2770 m long.  The east encloses  and the west encloses .  Towers in the walls were generally 15 m high in an 8 x 8 m footprint.  The more frequent flanking towers (cubelos in Portuguese) protruding from the walls were 5 x 5 m.  The wall was generally 8 m high and 175-220 cm wide depending on defensive conditions.

A variable, but generally 6 m wide barbican extended outward from the walls on many of the land-facing sections, ending with a low palisade.  An alambor protecting the steeper slopes beneath the belvedere at Graça Convent was unearthed during excavations in 2017.

Construction material varied.  Some sections were rammed earth with a dry lime binder, a typical Portuguese military practice.  Others were aggregate and mortar, and still others, particularly towers, were mortared masonry.  The builders used materials locally at hand but that yielded a uniformly strong structure.

An army engineer estimates around 86,000 cubic meters of material was required to build the cerca fernandina.  If this volume of stone blocks were made into a 1 m high wall, it would stretch from Lisbon approximately to Porto.  Given the time taken to build the wall, approximately 2000 labourers and craftsmen must have been involved in the effort.

Gallery

Notes

References

External links
 Walking tour of cerca moura — (in Portuguese)
 Tinoco's 1650 map of Lisbon depicting its walls — 

Lisbon
Lisbon
Buildings and structures in Lisbon
Lisbon
Lisbon
Lisbon
Structures in Lisbon
Lisbon
National monuments in Lisbon District
Tourist attractions in Lisbon